H and H Engineering Construction, Inc. is a railroad contractor based out of Stockton, California. H & H is incorporated in the State of California and has been in operation since October 1985.

Because H & H is involved in the construction and maintenance of railroad tracks, they also have had the need to purchase railway equipment and their reporting mark is HHEX.

H & H operates throughout the Western United States (west of the Rocky Mountains). Their work is done with physical labor, hydraulic power tools, and specialized railroad construction equipment such as tie inserters, ballast regulators, Mark III and Mark IV tampers and other heavy machinery.

Notable projects
 San Diego Sprinter Project (Oceanside, CA)
 Sacramento Southern Railroad extension into Freeport.
 Phoenix Light Rail Phase I
 Santa Clara Light Rail – Tasman Corridor

External links
 Official Website

Companies based in San Joaquin County, California